The Paraíba gecko (Phyllopezus periosus), also called commonly the Peraiba gecko, is a species of gecko, a lizard in the family Phyllodactylidae. The species is endemic to Brazil.

Etymology
The specific name, periosus, is Latin from the Greek περισσότερο, meaning "big, huge". The common name, "Paraíba gecko", refers to the Brazilian state of Paraíba.

Geographic range
P. periosus is found in the Brazilian states of Alagoas, Bahia, Ceará, Paraíba, Pernambuco, and Rio Grande do Norte.

Description
Dorsally, P. periosus has six or seven, dark brown, irregular-shaped crossbars, on a light gray ground color. Ventrally, adults are golden yellow, but juveniles are milky white.

Diet
P. periosus preys on insects and spiders.

Reproduction
P. periosus is oviparous.

References

Further reading
 (1986). "Uma nova espécie do gênero Phyllopezus de Cabaceiras: Paraíba: Brasil; com comentários sobre a fauna de lagartos da área (Sauria Gekkonidae) ". Papéis Avulsos de Zoologia, Museu de Zoologia da Univeridade de São Paulo 36 (20): 237–250. (Phyllopezus periosus, new species). (in Portuguese, with an abstract in English).

Phyllopezus
Lizards of South America
Reptiles of Brazil
Endemic fauna of Brazil
Reptiles described in 1986
Taxa named by Miguel Trefaut Rodrigues